Theodore G. Jenes Jr. (born February 21, 1930) is a retired lieutenant general in the United States Army. He was the commanding general of United States Army Central from 1984 to 1987 as well as Deputy Commanding General of United States Army Forces Command. Previously he served as Chief of Staff of the Eighth Army and Deputy Commander of the Combined Arm Combat Developments Activity at Fort Leavenworth, Kansas. Jenes earned a B.S. degree from the University of Georgia and an M.S. degree from Auburn University.

References

1930 births
Living people
Military personnel from Portland, Oregon
University of Georgia alumni
Auburn University alumni
United States Army personnel of the Vietnam War
United States Army Command and General Staff College alumni
Joint Forces Staff College alumni
Air War College alumni
Recipients of the Legion of Merit
United States Army generals
Recipients of the Distinguished Service Medal (US Army)